Choppadandi Assembly constituency is a SC reserved constituency of Telangana Legislative Assembly, India. It is one of 13 constituencies in Karimnagar district. It is part of Karimnagar Lok Sabha constituency.

Sunke Ravi Shankar of Telangana Rashtra Samithi won the seat for the first time with over 91090 majorities in 2019 Assembly Election.

Mandals
The Assembly Constituency presently comprises the following Mandals:

Election results

Telangana Legislative Assembly election, 2018

See also
 List of constituencies of Telangana Legislative Assembly

References

Assembly constituencies of Telangana
Karimnagar district